Jan Kopyto (born 15 June 1934) is a Polish javelin thrower. He competed at the 1956 Summer Olympics in Melbourne, where he placed fifth in men's javelin throw.

Personal life
Kopyto was born in Goczałki on 15 June 1934.

References

External links

1934 births
Living people
People from Grudziądz County
Polish male javelin throwers
Olympic athletes of Poland
Athletes (track and field) at the 1956 Summer Olympics
Sportspeople from Kuyavian-Pomeranian Voivodeship